The true meaning of Christmas is a phrase that began to appear in the mid-19th century when a shift toward a more secular culture resulted in a national backlash. Christians began to see the secularization of the celebration day of the birth of Christ as the shift toward Santa Claus and gift exchanging replaced the celebration of the advent of Christ and giving to the poor and needy without expectation of receiving anything in return. The poem A Visit from St. Nicholas (1822) helped popularize the tradition of exchanging gifts, and seasonal Christmas shopping began to assume economic importance. Harriet Beecher Stowe criticizes the commercialization in her story "Christmas; or, the Good Fairy". An early expression of this sentiment using the phrase of "the true meaning" is found in The American Magazine, vol. 28 (1889):
"to give up one's very self – to think only of others – how to bring the greatest happiness to others – that is the true meaning of Christmas."

The phrase is especially associated with Charles Dickens' A Christmas Carol (1843), in which an old miser named Ebeneezer Scrooge is taught the true meaning of Christmas by three ghostly visitors who review his past and foretell his future.

The topic was taken up by satirists such as Stan Freberg and Tom Lehrer during the 1950s and eventually by the influential TV special A Charlie Brown Christmas, first aired in 1965 and repeated every year since. In the special, Charlie Brown becomes stressed by the preparations and social expectations of holiday rather than becoming excited, much to his confusion. His best friend Linus van Pelt eventually clarifies the actual meaning of the holiday through reciting the Annunciation to the Shepherds near the end of the program. Dr. Seuss's How the Grinch Stole Christmas! (1957) also illustrates the topic, and was very influential in the form of an animated TV special produced in 1966. The phrase and the associated moral became used as a trope in numerous Christmas films since the 1960s. 

The phrase found its way into the 2003 Urbi et Orbi address of Pope John Paul II,  "The crib and the tree: precious symbols, which hand down in time the true meaning of Christmas!"

See also
 Christmas controversy
 List of Christmas films
 The True Meaning of Christmas Special

References

Christmas
Literary motifs
Phrases
Criticism of the commercialization of Christmas